Twenty Four Seven is the tenth and final solo studio album by Tina Turner, released on October 28, 1999, by Parlophone and Virgin Records (U.S.). It was Turner's last studio album before her retirement from recording.

Composition
The album was produced by Mark Taylor and Brian Rawling, the team behind Cher's Believe, Johnny Douglas (Kylie Minogue, George Michael, All Saints etc.), Terry Britten and Absolute, known for their work with British pop acts like Lisa Stansfield, Will Young, Atomic Kitten, Gareth Gates, and S Club 7. Bryan Adams appears on both the title track and "Without You".

In 2000, the album was released as a limited-edition special pack with a bonus disc including live recordings from Turner's 60th birthday celebration in London in November 1999, as well as the music videos for "When the Heartache Is Over" and "Whatever You Need".

Twenty Four Seven was Turner's last full-length studio album before her retirement from recording.

Singles
Singles released from the album include "When the Heartache Is Over" (US No. 3 Dance Charts), (UK No. 10), "Whatever You Need" (UK No. 27), and "Don't Leave Me This Way".

Critical reception

AllMusic editor Mark Morgenstein found that "Tina still puts Mariah Carey and Celine Dion to shame. But unfortunately, on Twenty Four Seven, the famous Turner passion is often submerged in glossy production that virtually defines "adult contemporary." In some transcendent moments, Tina reminds us of the woman who sang "River Deep, Mountain High" [...] As Tina sings in "Absolutely Nothing's Changed," she's lived to fight another day, and that's proof she ain't been broken." Similarly, Rolling Stones Anthony DeCurtis wrote that "at sixty, Turner still sounds incredible; she's lost remarkably little of her range and none of her power. She sweeps through the eleven generic tracks on this album with the force of a tornado whipping through a trailer park [...} Twenty Four Seven is the theme-park version of [a] masterful performer – evocative of the real thing but ultimately harmless, which is about the last thing Tina Turner should be."

Commercial performance
The album was released in Europe in November 1999 and has sold more than 1 million copies on the continent. It reached No. 9 in the UK Albums Chart. The album was released in February 2000 in the US and Canada and reached No. 21 on the Billboard 200, selling 60,000 copies in its first week. It was certified platinum in various countries, including the United Kingdom.

Track listing

Notes
  signifies an additional producer
  signifies a co-producer

Personnel and credits 
Credits are taken from the album's liner notes.

Musicians

 Tina Turner – lead vocals  
 Tracy Ackerman, Bryan Adams, Terry Britten - backing vocals
 Pete Lincoln - acoustic guitar
 Pino Palladino - bass guitar
 Terry Britten, Phil Hudson, Milton McDonald, Phil Palmer, Adam Phillips, Alan Ross - guitar
 Peter Hope-Evans - harmonica
 Duncan Mackay, Mike Stevens, Nichol Thompson - horns
 Absolute, Marcus Brown, Dave Clews, Johnny Douglas, Graham Stack, Mark Taylor - other instrumentation 
 Mark Taylor - keyboards
 Bruno Bridges - programming
 The London Musicians Orchestra - strings
 Steve Sidwell - trumpet

Technical and production
 Record producers – Absolute, Terry Britten, Johnny Douglas, Brian Rawling, Mark Taylor
 Engineering – Marc Lane, Ren Swan, Paul Wright - sound engineer
 Mastering engineer – Doug Sax

Charts

Weekly charts

Year-end charts

Certifications and sales

Release history

References

1999 albums
Albums produced by Brian Rawling
Albums produced by Mark Taylor (music producer)
Dance music albums by American artists
Parlophone albums
Tina Turner albums
Virgin Records albums